East of the Sun may refer to:

East of the Sun (Lin Halliday album), 1992
East of the Sun (Roy Harper album), 2001
East of the Sun (Tuatara album), 2007
"East of the Sun (and West of the Moon)", a 1935 jazz standard
 East of the Sun, a 2009 novel by Julia Gregson

See also
 East of the Sun and West of the Moon (disambiguation)
Di Timur Matahari, a 2012 Indonesian film